Bouabdellah Daoud (born February 3, 1978 in Oran, Algeria) is an Algerian footballer.

Daoud has 19 caps for the Algerian National Team.

National team statistics

References

External links
 
 

1978 births
Algerian footballers
Algeria international footballers
Living people
JS Kabylie players
Footballers from Oran
CR Témouchent players
MC Oran players
Expatriate footballers in Tunisia
Espérance Sportive de Tunis players
WA Tlemcen players
ASO Chlef players
Algerian expatriate sportspeople in Tunisia
People from Aïn Témouchent Province
IRB Maghnia players
Algerian Ligue Professionnelle 1 players
Algerian Ligue 2 players
Association football forwards
21st-century Algerian people